Barbette Stanley Spaeth is an associate professor at College of William and Mary,  and is an expert in Roman mythology.  She is past secretary of the Williamsburg Society, Archaeological Institute of America, and president of the Society for Ancient Mediterranean Religions.

She graduated from Johns Hopkins University with a PhD.

Spaeth wrote her doctoral dissertation on Ceres which became an acclaimed and well-cited treatise, The Roman Goddess Ceres.  She was a professor at Tulane University, from 1987 to 2001.

She has won numerous awards for her work in academia.

Selected publications
Spaeth, Barbette Stanley, "The Goddess Ceres and the Death of Tiberius Gracchus", Historia: Zeitschrift für Alte Geschichte, Vol. 39, No. 2, 1990.

See also
 Aventine Triad
 Cerealia
 Crisis of the Roman Republic
 Enna
 Liber and Libera (mythology)
 Mother goddess
 Sexuality in ancient Rome
 Women in Ancient Rome

References

External links
LSU website
academia website
Pamphile's homepage, VROMA

Living people
College of William & Mary faculty
Tulane University faculty
Johns Hopkins University alumni
Year of birth missing (living people)